Valeria Andreyevna Shabalina (born 9 June 1995) is a Russian Paralympic swimmer who competes in international level events. She is a three-time Paralympic champion. Furthermore, she has won multiple medals in both World Para Swimming Championships and INAS Global Games. She is a Merited Master of Sports of Russia.

References

External links 
 

1995 births
Living people
Sportspeople from Chelyabinsk
Paralympic swimmers of Russia
Medalists at the World Para Swimming Championships
Medalists at the World Para Swimming European Championships
Swimmers at the 2020 Summer Paralympics
Medalists at the 2020 Summer Paralympics
Paralympic medalists in swimming
Paralympic gold medalists for the Russian Paralympic Committee athletes
Paralympic silver medalists for the Russian Paralympic Committee athletes
Russian female freestyle swimmers
Russian female backstroke swimmers
Russian female breaststroke swimmers
Russian female butterfly swimmers
Russian female medley swimmers
S14-classified Paralympic swimmers
20th-century Russian women
21st-century Russian women